John Sitgreaves (1757 – March 4, 1802) was a delegate to the Congress of the Confederation, a United States Attorney for the District of North Carolina and a United States district judge of the United States District Court for the District of North Carolina, the United States District Court for the Edenton, New Bern & Wilmington Districts of North Carolina and the United States District Court for the Albemarle, Cape Fear & Pamptico Districts of North Carolina.

Education and career

Born in 1757, in England, Sitgreaves attended Eton College in England and read law. He entered private practice in New Bern, North Carolina, Province of North Carolina, British America (State of North Carolina, United States from July 4, 1776). He served in the Continental Army as a lieutenant during the American Revolutionary War, serving as a military aide to General William Caswell. He was clerk for the North Carolina Senate from 1777 to 1779. He was a member of the Board of Auditors for Public and Private Accounts in 1779. He was a commissioner for the sale of confiscated properties in New Bern in 1780. He was a member of the North Carolina House of Commons (now the North Carolina House of Representatives) in 1784, and from 1786 to 1788, serving as Speaker from 1787 to 1788. He was a delegate to the Congress of the Confederation (Continental Congress) from 1784 to 1785. He was a member of the North Carolina convention to ratify the United States Constitution. He was the United States Attorney for the District of North Carolina from 1789 to 1790.

Federal judicial service

Sitgreaves was nominated by President George Washington on December 17, 1790, to a seat on the United States District Court for the District of North Carolina vacated by Judge John Stokes. He was confirmed by the United States Senate on December 20, 1790, and received his commission the same day. His service terminated on March 4, 1802, due to his death in Halifax, North Carolina. He was interred in Colonial Churchyard in Halifax.

Sitgreaves was nominated to the United States Circuit Court for the Fifth Circuit on February 21, 1801, and was confirmed by the Senate on February 24, 1801, but he declined the appointment.

References

Sources

 

1757 births
1802 deaths
18th-century American politicians
18th-century American judges
Continental Army officers from North Carolina
Continental Congressmen from North Carolina
Judges of the United States District Court for the District of North Carolina
Members of the North Carolina House of Representatives
North Carolina lawyers
People educated at Eton College
Politicians from New Bern, North Carolina
United States Attorneys
United States federal judges appointed by George Washington
Date of birth missing
United States federal judges admitted to the practice of law by reading law
People from Halifax County, North Carolina